Pierrick Capelle (born 15 April 1987) is a French professional footballer who plays as a midfielder for Ligue 1 club Angers.

Honours 
Quevilly

 Coupe de France runner-up: 2011–12

Angers

 Coupe de France runner-up: 2016–17

Angers B

 Championnat National 3: 2018–19

References

External links

Pierrick Capelle profile at foot-national.com

1987 births
Living people
People from Lesquin
Sportspeople from Nord (French department)
French footballers
Association football midfielders
CS Avion players
US Quevilly-Rouen Métropole players
Clermont Foot players
Angers SCO players
Championnat National 2 players
Championnat National players
Ligue 2 players
Championnat National 3 players
Ligue 1 players
Footballers from Hauts-de-France